Bayqara may refer to:
 Bayqara Kuh
 Bayqara Rud
 Bayqara Mirza I